Rasadnik Hall in Skopje is a multi-functional indoor sports arena. It is located in the Municipality of Kisela Voda, Skopje. It has a maximum seating capacity of 1.000-1.500. This hall is used by OK Vardar (Volleyball Team).In the past it was used by RK Vardar and RK Tineks Prolet.

Buildings and structures in Skopje